ORP Orkan, formerly HMS Myrmidon was an M-class destroyer of the Polish Navy during World War II. The name translates as "windstorm". She was sunk by the German submarine  on 8 October 1943. There were 179 dead and 44 survivors.

Description
The M-class destroyers were repeats of the preceding L class. They were powered by Parsons geared steam turbines, each driving one propeller shaft, using steam provided by two Admiralty three-drum boilers. The ships' complement was 190 officers and ratings.

The M class mounted six 4.7-inch (120 mm) Mark XI guns in twin-gun mounts, two superfiring in front of the bridge and one aft of the superstructure. The aft torpedo tubes were replaced by a single QF 4-inch Mk V anti-aircraft gun. Their light anti-aircraft suite was composed of one quadruple mount for 2-pounder "pom-pom" guns, two single Oerlikon 20 mm cannon and two quadruple and two twin mounts for 0.5 inch Vickers Mark III anti-aircraft machinegun. Later in the war, single Oerlikons replaced the .50-calibre machineguns and, still later, twin Oerlikon mounts replaced four of the singles. The M-class ships completed with only one above-water quadruple mount for  torpedoes, but the aft mount was later replaced and the 4-inch AA gun removed. The ships were equipped with two depth charge throwers, two racks and 42 depth charges.

Construction and career

She was built by the Fairfield Shipbuilding and Engineering Company in Govan, Scotland. She was originally commissioned into the Royal Navy as HMS Myrmidon and was funded by St Helens as the result of the Warships Week National Savings campaign. She was transferred to the free Polish Navy based in Britain in December 1942. Orkan served in the Arctic, In early 1943, the destroyer escorted the convoy JW 53 to Russia, returned with the convoy RA 52 and then operated as convoy escort in the North Atlantic. In July 1943, she transferred the body of the Polish Supreme Chief General Władysław Sikorski from Gibraltar to England.

At 07.05 hours on 8 October 1943, Orkan (under Lt. Stanisław Hryniewiecki) was hit by a GNAT homing torpedo from U-378 while escorting the convoy SC 143 and sank within a few minutes.

Notes

References

External links
Polish Navy in Scotland
U boat.net
HMS Cavalier website

 

L and M-class destroyers of the Royal Navy
Ships built in Govan
1941 ships
World War II destroyers of the United Kingdom
M-class destroyers of the Polish Navy
World War II destroyers of Poland
Ships sunk by German submarines in World War II
Shipwrecks in the Barents Sea
World War II shipwrecks in the Arctic Ocean
Maritime incidents in October 1943